The Secretary for Transport and Public Works is the department of the Macau Government responsible for overseeing a number of the region's important services.

The department was originally called Secretary for Transport and Public Works.

List of departments
 Cartography and Cadastre Bureau
 Marine and Water Bureau
 Macau Post
 Meteorological and Geophysical Bureau
 based a Tapia Grande after moving from Fortaleza do Monte
 Housing Bureau
 Environmental Protection Bureau
 Civil Aviation Authority 
 Infrastructure Development Office
 Energy Sector Development Office, to be integrated to the Environmental Protection Bureau by January 2021.
 Bureau of Telecommunications Regulation
 Land, Public Works and Transport Bureau

List of Secretariats

Director
 Wong Chan Tong

See also
 Transport in Macau

Other Secretariats
 Secretary for Administration and Justice (Macau)
 Secretary for Economy and Finance (Macau)
 Secretary for Security (Macau)
 Secretary for Social Affairs and Culture (Macau)

References

External links 
 www.dssopt.gov.mo/

Government departments and agencies of Macau
Transport and Public Works, Secretariat for
Macau
Political office-holders in Macau
Positions of the Macau Government
1999 establishments in Macau
Transport organizations based in China